Robin is the alias of several superheroes appearing in American comic books published by DC Comics. The character was originally created by Bob Kane, Bill Finger, and Jerry Robinson, to serve as a junior counterpart and the sidekick to the superhero Batman. As a team, Batman and Robin have commonly been referred to as the Caped Crusaders and the Dynamic Duo. The character's first incarnation, Dick Grayson, debuted in Detective Comics #38 (April 1940). Conceived as a way to attract young readership, Robin garnered overwhelmingly positive critical reception, doubling the sales of the Batman titles. Robin's early adventures included Star Spangled Comics #65–130 (1947–1952), the character's first solo feature. He made regular appearances in Batman-related comic books and other DC Comics publications from 1940 through the early 1980s, until the character set aside the Robin identity and became the independent superhero Nightwing. 

The character's second incarnation, Jason Todd, first appeared in Batman #357 (1983). He made regular appearances in Batman-related comic books until 1988, when he was murdered by the Joker in the storyline "A Death in the Family" (1989). Jason later found himself alive after a reality-changing incident, eventually becoming the Red Hood. The premiere Robin limited series was published in 1991, featuring the character's third incarnation, Tim Drake, training to earn the role of Batman's vigilante partner. After two successful sequels, the monthly Robin series began in 1993 and ended in early 2009, which also helped his transition from sidekick to a superhero in his own right. In 2004 storylines, established DC Comics character Stephanie Brown became the fourth Robin for a short time before the role reverted to Tim Drake. Damian Wayne succeeds Drake as Robin in the 2009 story arc "Battle for the Cowl."

The current and former Robins always feature prominently in Batman's cast of supporting heroes; Dick, Jason, Tim, and Damian all regard him as a father. In current continuity as of 2021, Dick Grayson serves as Nightwing, Jason Todd is the Red Hood, Stephanie Brown is Batgirl, and Tim Drake has picked up the mantle of Robin again after a stint as Red Robin. Damian has left behind the title Robin, but remains the title character of the Robin comic book. In recent years, Batman has also adopted new sidekicks in the form of Bluebird, whose name references Robin, and The Signal.

Creation

About a year after Batman's debut, Batman creators Bob Kane and Bill Finger introduced Robin the Boy Wonder in Detective Comics #38 (1940). The name "Robin the Boy Wonder" and the medieval look of the original costume were inspired by Robin Hood. Jerry Robinson noted he "came up with Robin because the adventures of Robin Hood were boyhood favorites of mine. I had been given a Robin Hood book illustrated by N. C. Wyeth ... and that's what I quickly sketched out when I suggested the name Robin Hood, which they seemed to like, and then showed them the costume. And if you look at it, it's Wyeth's costume, from my memory, because I didn't have the book to look at." Other accounts of Robin's origin state that the name comes from the bird called the American robin, not from Robin Hood, Frank Miller's All Star Batman and Robin being a notable exception. Sometimes both sources are credited, as in Len Wein's The Untold Legend of the Batman. Although Robin is best known as Batman's sidekick, the Robins have also been members of the superhero groups the Teen Titans (with the original Robin, Dick Grayson, as a founding member and the latter group's leader) and Young Justice.

In Batman stories, the character of Robin was intended to be Batman's Watson: Bill Finger, writer for many early Batman adventures, said:

"Robin was an outgrowth of a conversation I had with Bob. As I said, Batman was a combination of Douglas Fairbanks and Sherlock Holmes. Holmes had his Watson. The thing that bothered me was that Batman didn't have anyone to talk to, and it got a little tiresome always having him thinking. I found that as I went along Batman needed a Watson to talk to. That's how Robin came to be. Bob called me over and said he was going to put a boy in the strip to identify with Batman. I thought it was a great idea."

Fictional character biography
The following fictional characters have assumed the Robin role at various times in the main  continuity:

Dick Grayson

In the comics, Dick Grayson was an 8-year-old acrobat and the youngest of a family act called the "Flying Graysons". A gangster named Boss Zucco, loosely based on actor Edward G. Robinson's Little Caesar character, had been extorting money from the circus and killed Grayson's parents, John and Mary, by sabotaging their trapeze equipment as a warning against defiance. Batman investigated the crime and, as his alter ego billionaire Bruce Wayne, had Dick put under his custody as a legal ward. Together they investigated Zucco and collected the evidence needed to bring him to justice. From his debut appearance in 1940 through 1969, Robin was known as the Boy Wonder. Batman creates a costume for Dick, consisting of a red tunic, yellow cape, green gloves, green boots, green spandex briefs, and a utility belt. As he grew older, graduated from high school, and enrolled in Hudson University, Robin continued his career as the Teen Wonder, from 1970 into the early 1980s.

The character was rediscovered by a new generation of fans during the 1980s because of the success of The New Teen Titans, in which he left Batman's shadow entirely to assume the identity of Nightwing. He aids Batman throughout the later storyline regarding the several conflicts with Jason Todd until he makes his final return as the "Red Hood". Grayson temporarily took over as Batman (while Wayne was traveling through time), using the aid of Damian Wayne, making his newish appearance as "Robin", to defeat and imprison Todd. With Bruce Wayne's return, Grayson went back to being Nightwing.

Jason Todd

DC was initially hesitant to turn Grayson into Nightwing and to replace him with a new Robin. To minimize the change, they made the new Robin, Jason Peter Todd, who first appeared in Batman #357 (1983), similar to a young Grayson. Like Dick Grayson, Jason Todd was the son of circus acrobats murdered by a criminal (this time the Batman adversary Killer Croc), and then adopted by Bruce Wayne. In this incarnation, he was originally red-haired and unfailingly cheerful, and wore his circus costume to fight crime until Dick Grayson presented him with a Robin suit of his own. At that point, he dyed his hair black.

After the miniseries Crisis on Infinite Earths, much of the DC Comics continuity was redone. Dick Grayson's origin, years with Batman, and growth into Nightwing remained mostly unchanged; but Todd's character was completely revised. He was now a black-haired street orphan who first encountered Batman when he attempted to steal tires from the Batmobile. Batman saw to it that he was placed in a school for troubled youths. Weeks later, after Dick Grayson became Nightwing and Todd proved his crime-fighting worth by helping Batman catch a gang of robbers, Batman offered Todd the position as Robin.

Believing that readers never truly bonded with Todd, DC Comics made the controversial decision in 1988 to poll readers using a 1-900 number as to whether or not Todd should be killed. The event received more attention in the mainstream media than any other comic book event before it.  Readers voted "yes" by a small margin (5,343 to 5,271) and Todd was subsequently murdered by the Joker in the storyline, A Death in the Family, in which the psychopath beat the youngster severely with a crowbar, and left him to die in a warehouse rigged with a bomb.

Jason Todd later returned as the new Red Hood (the original alias of the Joker) when he was brought back to life due to reality being altered.  After the continuity changes following the New 52 DC Comics relaunch, Jason becomes a leader of the Outlaws, a superhero team that includes Starfire and Arsenal who had spent years with Grayson in the Titans.

Tim Drake

DC Comics was left uncertain about readers' decision to have Jason Todd killed, wondering if readers preferred Batman as a lone vigilante, disliked Todd specifically, or just wanted to see if DC would actually kill off the character. In addition, the 1989 Batman film did not feature Robin, giving DC a reason to keep him out of the comic book series for marketing purposes. Regardless, Batman editor Denny O'Neil introduced a new Robin. The third Robin, Timothy Drake, first appeared in a flashback in Batman #436 (1989) as a preadolescent boy, introduced by writer Marv Wolfman, interior penciler Pat Broderick, and inker John Beatty. Drake's first name was a nod to Tim Burton, director of the 1989 Batman film. The character first donned the Robin costume, and became associated with the third version of Robin, in the acclaimed "A Lonely Place of Dying" sequel storyline, which culminated in issue #442, written by Marv Wolfman with cover art by George Pérez, storyline interior pencils by Pérez, Tom Grummett, as well as Jim Aparo, and inks by Mike DeCarlo. In addition to establishing Tim Drake as a principal character in Batman and Detective Comics, Lauren R. O'Connor argues that "A Lonely Place of Dying" served as the denouement of a transition from Dick Grayson's "absent sexuality," which earlier incited reader interpretations of homosexuality, to definitive heterosexual presence as a maturation narrative. O'Connor offers multiple examples from this 1989 storyline, such as Drake's encounter with Starfire and Grayson's heeding of Drake's concerns over Batman's psychology, to substantiate the notion of a heterosexual bildungsroman subplot.

The ensuing Tim Drake storylines, authored by the late Alan Grant and penciled by the late Norm Breyfogle, coupled with the 1989 release of Burton's Batman, spurred sales of both comic book titles Batman and Detective Comics. For the latter, Grant attested in 2007 that "when the Batman movie came out, the sales went up, if I recall correctly, from around 75,000 to about 675,000." 1989-90 was indeed the "Year of the Bat:" Capital and Diamond City Distributors reported that the Year One-inspired Batman: Legends of the Dark Knight dominated four out of the five spots for preorders (not total sales and second printings). The only exception was the third preorder spot, snagged by Batman #442, the conclusion to Tim Drake's "A Lonely Place of Dying" storyline. The "Year of the Bat" continued into the first half of 1990. Preorders for Batman and Detective Comics issues featuring a revived Joker and Penguin began to compete with, and even edged out, the last three parts of Grant Morrison's and Klaus Janson's Gothic storyline in Legends. Todd McFarlane's Spider-Man arrived in the second half of 1990, inaugurating six months of Spidermania (or Mcfarlamania, depending on the reader). DC closed out 1990 with vendors under-ordering issues, prompting the publisher to push Batman #457 and the first part of the Robin mini-series into second and then third printings. The next year, 1991, witnessed the ascension of Chris Claremont's, Jim Lee's, and Scott Williams's X-Men against Magneto, as well as Fabian Nicieza's and Rob Liefeld's X-Force, into the top of the preorder rankings. The only exception to this X-mania was, again, Tim Drake and the sequel to the Robin miniseries, the first variant issue of which garnered the third spot, firmly wedged between variant issues of X-Force and X-Men. The mini-series pitted solo Robin against the Joker, in response to fan demands for a matchup since "A Death in the Family." The 1990s comic booming bust had begun. In a supplemental interview with Daniel Best, Alan Grant added that "every issue from about that time [after the 'Year of the Bat'] that featured Robin sales went up because Robin did have his own fans." Although both Grant and Breyfogle initially believed that their Anarky character could potentially become the third version of Robin, they were quick to support the editorial decision to focus on Drake. The social anarchist duo adopted the character as their own in the early 1990s, during Grant's shift to libertarian socialism but before his late 1990s emphasis on Neo Tech. Breyfogle agreed that "it was a big thing to bring in the new Robin, yes. I know my fans often point specifically to that double page splash where his costume first appears as a big event for them as fans and I usually have to point out to them that Neal Adams was the one who designed the costume. The ‘R’ symbol and the staff were all that was really mine." In the "Rite of Passage" storyline for Detective Comics, Grant and Breyfogle intertwined 1) Drake matching wits with Anarky; 2) a criminal and anthropological investigation into an apocryphal Haitian vodou cult (revealed by Batman, asserting anthropological and investigative authority, as a front for extortion and crony capitalism); 3) the murder of Drake's mother by vilified cult leaders; 4) the beginning of Drake's recurrent nightmares and trauma; as well as 5) the perspective of a child of one of the cult's Haitian followers, unknowingly and inadvertently orphaned by Batman at the end of the four-issue arc.

Tim Drake eventually transitioned from late preadolescence to adolescence, becoming the third Robin over the course of the storylines "Rite of Passage" and "Identity Crisis," with all issues scripted by Alan Grant and penciled by Norm Breyfogle. Story arcs that included Drake only in subplots or featured his training in criminal investigation, such as "Crimesmith" and "The Penguin Affair," were either written or co-written by Grant and Wolfman, with pencils by Breyfogle, Aparo, and M. D. Bright. Immediately afterwards, the character starred in the five-issue miniseries Robin, written by Chuck Dixon, with interior pencils by Tom Lyle and cover art by Brian Bolland. The new Batman and Robin team went on their first official mission together in the story "Debut," again written by Grant and penciled by Breyfogle. Lauren R. O'Connor contends that, in early Tim Drake appearances, writers such as Grant and Chuck Dixon "had a lexicon of teenage behavior from which to draw, unlike when Dick Grayson was introduced and the concept of the teenager was still nascent. They wisely mobilized the expected adolescent behaviors of parental conflict, hormonal urges, and identity formation to give Tim emotional depth and complexity, making him a relatable character with boundaries between his two selves." In the Robin ongoing series, when Drake had fully transitioned into an adolescent character, Chuck Dixon depicted him as engaging in adolescent intimacy, yet still stopped short at overt heterosexual consummation. This narrative benchmark maintained Robin's "estrangement from sex" that began in the Grayson years. Erica McCrystal likewise observes that Alan Grant, prior to Dixon's series, connected Drake to Batman's philosophy of heroic or anti-heroic "vigilantism" as "therapeutic for children of trauma. But this kind of therapy has a delicate integration process." The overcoming of trauma entailed distinct identity intersections and emotional restraint, as well as a "complete understanding" of symbol and self. Bruce Wayne, a former child of trauma, guided "other trauma victims down a path of righteousness." Tim Drake, for example, endured trauma and "emotional duress" as a result of the death of his mother (father in a coma and on a ventilator). Drake contemplated the idea of fear, and overcoming it, in both the "Rite of Passage" and "Identity Crisis" storylines. Grant and Breyfogle subjected Drake to recurrent nightmares, from hauntings by a ghoulish Batman to the disquieting lullaby (or informal nursery rhyme), "My Mummy's dead...My Mummy's Dead...I can't get it through my head," echoing across a cemetery for deceased parents. Drake ultimately defeated his own preadolescent fears "somewhat distant from Bruce Wayne" and "not as an orphan." By the end of "Identity Crisis," an adolescent Drake had "proven himself as capable of being a vigilante" by deducing the role of fear in instigating a series of violent crimes.

In the comics, Tim Drake was a late preadolescent boy who had followed the adventures of Batman and Robin ever since witnessing the murder of the Flying Graysons. This served to connect Drake to Grayson, establishing a link that DC hoped would help readers accept this new Robin. Drake surmised their secret identities with his amateur but instinctive detective skills and followed their careers closely. Tim stated on numerous occasions that he wishes to become "The World's Greatest Detective", a title currently belonging to the Dark Knight. Batman himself stated that one day Drake will surpass him as a detective. Despite his combat skills not being the match of Grayson's (although there are some similarities, in that they are far superior to Todd's when he was Robin), his detective skills more than make up for this. In addition, Batman supplied him with a new armored costume for his transition to the adolescent Robin.

Tim Drake's first Robin costume had a red torso, yellow stitching and belt, black boots, and green short sleeves, gloves, pants, and domino mask. He wore a cape that was black on the outside and yellow on the inside. This costume had an armored tunic and gorget, an emergency "R" shuriken on his chest in addition to the traditional batarangs and a collapsible bo staff as his primary weapon, which Tim Drake continues to use as the superhero Red Robin. Neal Adams redesigned the entire costume with the exception of the "R" shuriken logo, first sketched by Norm Breyfogle.

Tim Drake is the first Robin to have his own comic book series, where he fought crime on his own. Tim Drake, as Robin, co-founded the superhero team Young Justice in the absence of the Teen Titans of Dick Grayson's generation, but would then later re-form the Teen Titans after Young Justice disbanded following a massive sidekick crossover during which Donna Troy was killed. Tim served as leader of this version of the Titans until 2009, at which point he quit due to the events of Batman R.I.P.

Following Infinite Crisis and 52, Tim Drake modified his costume to favor a mostly red and black color scheme in tribute to his best friend, Superboy (Kon-El), who died fighting Earth-Prime Superboy. This Robin costume had a red torso, long sleeves, and pants. It also included black gloves and boots, yellow stitching and belt, and a black and yellow cape. Tim Drake continued the motif of a red and black costume when he assumed the role of Red Robin before and during the events of The New 52.

Tim Drake assumes the identity of the Red Robin after Batman's disappearance following the events of Final Crisis and "Battle for the Cowl" and Damian Wayne becoming Grayson's Robin. Following 2011's continuity changes resulting from The New 52 DC Comics relaunch, history was altered such that Tim Drake never took up the Robin mantle after Jason Todd's death, feeling that it would be inappropriate. Instead, he served as Batman's sidekick under the name of the Red Robin. However, in DC's Rebirth relaunch, his original origin was restored.

In 2020s comics tying in with DC’s Infinite Frontier era, Drake returns to the Robin mantle as Batman’s primary crime-fighting partner when Damian goes on a soul-searching journey. Meanwhile, in his solo adventures, he goes on his own soul-searching journey, and reconnects with his old friend Bernard Dowd, whom he begins to date. Tim later comes out to Batman and is accepted. His solo series Tim Drake: Robin explores a young adult Tim living alone at the marina, developing a closer relationship with Bernard, and adopting his own crime-fighting partner in the form of Sparrow (Darcy Thomas), a former member of the We Are Robin movement.

Stephanie Brown

Stephanie Brown, Tim Drake's girlfriend and the costumed adventurer previously known as the Spoiler, volunteered for the role of Robin upon Tim's resignation. Batman fired the Girl Wonder for not obeying his orders to the letter on two occasions. Stephanie then stole one of Batman's incomplete plans to control Gotham's crime and executed it. Trying to prove her worthiness, Brown inadvertently set off a gang war on the streets of Gotham. While trying to help end the war, Brown was captured and tortured by the lunatic crime boss Black Mask. She managed to escape, but apparently died shortly afterwards due to the severity of her injuries. Tim Drake keeps a memorial for her in his cave hideout underneath Titans Tower in San Francisco. She appeared alive and stalking Tim, after his return from traveling around the globe with his mentor. It turned out that Dr. Leslie Thompkins had faked Stephanie's death in an effort to protect her. For years she operated on and off as the Spoiler, but was then recruited as Barbara Gordon's replacement as Batgirl. She had her own series, as well as making appearances throughout various Batman and Batman spin-off series.  Her time as the Spoiler, Robin, and Batgirl was retconned to have never occurred after the Flashpoint event, with her being reintroduced having just become the Spoiler in Batman Eternal. However, her history as Robin was later restored.

Damian Wayne

Damian Wayne was the child of Bruce Wayne and Talia al Ghul, thus the grandson of the immortal Ra's al Ghul. Batman was unaware of his son's existence for years until Talia left Damian in his care. Damian was violent and lacking in discipline and morality, and was trained by the League of Assassins. Learning to kill at a young age, Damian's murderous behavior created a troubled relationship with his father, who vowed never to take a life.

Originally conceived to become a host for his maternal grandfather's soul as well as a pawn against the Dark Knight, Batman saved his child from this fate, which forced Ra's to inhabit his own son's body, and thus, Damian was affectionate to his father.  After Batman's apparent death during Final Crisis, Talia left her son under Dick Grayson and Alfred Pennyworth's care and Damian was deeply affected by his father's absence. In the first issue of "Battle for the Cowl", Damian was driving the Batmobile and was attacked by Poison Ivy and Killer Croc. Damian was rescued by Nightwing, who then tries to escape, but was shot down by Black Mask's men. Nightwing tried to fight the thugs, but the thugs were shot by Jason Todd. After a fight between Nightwing and Todd, Todd eventually shot Damian in the chest. In the final issue of the series, Alfred made Damian into Robin. Damian's first task as Robin was to rescue Tim. After "Battle for the Cowl", Grayson adopted the mantle of Batman, and instead of having Tim (whom he viewed as an equal rather than a protégé) remain as Robin, he gave the role to Damian, whom he felt needed the training that his father would have given him.

Following the Batman: The Return of Bruce Wayne and  Flashpoint events, Bruce Wayne returned to his role as Batman, while Dick resumed as Nightwing. As of The New 52, Damian continued to work with his father, but temporarily gave up being Robin (as his mother had put a price on his head), and went under the identity of Red Bird. Damian met his end at the hands of the Heretic, an aged clone of Damian working for Leviathan, bravely giving up his life. Despite his status as deceased, Damian starred in his own miniseries, Damian: Son of Batman, written and drawn by Andy Kubert, set in a future where Damian is on the path to become Batman after his father fell victim to a trap set by the Joker.  Batman eventually started a difficult quest to resurrect him, returning Damian to life with Darkseid's Chaos Shard.

Other versions

Bruce Wayne

A Batman story from the 1950s featured the young Bruce Wayne assuming the identity of Robin, complete with the original costume, in order to learn the basics of detective work from a famous detective named Harvey Harris. The purpose of the secret identity was to prevent Harris from learning Wayne's true motivation for approaching him, which could have led to the detective attempting to discourage the boy from pursuing his obsession. Though this story remained canonical through most of the 1980s (it was revisited in the three-issue miniseries The Untold Legend of the Batman in 1980), it was revised Post-Crisis to edit out any reference to Bruce Wayne having ever called himself "Robin" or worn any costume before he finally donned his Batman costume as an adult. John Byrne later worked this aspect into his non-canonical story Superman & Batman: Generations.

Post-Crisis, there was one instance in continuity when Bruce Wayne adopted the Robin persona. In Batboy & Robin, a tie-in special to the DC Comics storyline Sins of Youth, Bruce and Tim Drake, the third Robin, had their ages magically switched. In an effort to keep up the illusion of Batman, Bruce had Tim adopt the Batman identity, while he is forced to be Robin.

Earth-Two Robin, before Crisis on Infinite Earths

On Earth-Two, home of the Golden Age version of DC's superheroes, Dick Grayson continued to be Robin even as an adult, having no successors, and even after Batman's death. His allies as a boy included the All-Star Squadron, along with Batwoman and Flamebird.

By the 1960s, Grayson had become an adult, and was a lawyer and the ambassador to South Africa. He adopted a more Batman-like costume, but still fought crime as Robin. This adult version of Dick Grayson debuted in Justice League of America #55, where he also became a member of the Justice Society of America. Although in semi-retirement for a time, he was called back to active duty when he rejoined the Justice Society during the period when he, Power Girl and the Star-Spangled Kid, assisted them as the Super Squad.

He appeared to have died during the 1985 miniseries Crisis on Infinite Earths, in which the DC Multiverse was reduced to one Universe, and this version of Grayson, as well as the Earth-Two Batman, were deemed never to have existed. The Earth-2 concept was revived and reimagined twice subsequently, following the comic books 52 (2006–7) and Flashpoint (2011).

The Toy Wonder

In the DC One Million storyline, members of the Justice League of America encounter a variety of heroes from the future, including an 853rd-century Batman who patrols the prison planet Pluto. This version of Batman is accompanied by a robotic Robin who contains a transcribed copy of his own personality from before his parents were murdered by Plutonian criminals.

This Robin (who calls himself "the Toy Wonder") is a member of the Justice Legion T in addition to serving as a deliberate counterbalance to Batman's dark personality.

Elseworlds versions

Elseworlds versions of DC characters are ones that exist in alternate timelines or realities that take place in entirely self-contained continuities. In Elseworlds, Robin has been a German immigrant during World War II named Richart Graustark, Bruce Wayne Jr. (the son of Julia Madison and Bruce Wayne), a genetically enhanced ape named Rodney, a samurai named Tengu, a pirate's cabin boy, a girl traveling via space ship to a far-off colonial planet, Bruce Wayne's nephew Thomas Wayne III, MI-6 agent Alfred Pennyworth, Bruce Wayne's sister during the Reign of Terror in France, and a Native American named Red Bird.

Carrie Kelley 

In Frank Miller's non-canonical The Dark Knight Returns, the role of Robin is filled by Carrie Kelley, a 13-year-old girl. She becomes Robin, and is accepted by the Batman after she saves his life. Unlike the previous Robins, Carrie is not an orphan, but she appears to have rather neglectful parents who are never actually depicted (one of them mutters "Didn't we have a kid?" while their daughter is watching the fierce battle between Batman and the Mutants). It is hinted through their dialogue that they were once activists and possibly hippies during the 1960s, but have since become apathetic stoners. She was the first female Robin and the first Robin with living parents. In the sequel, Batman: The Dark Knight Strikes Again, 2001, Carrie dons the identity of Catgirl, but still works as Batman's second-in-command.

She was also featured in an episode of The New Batman Adventures entitled "Legends of the Dark Knight". She then appeared in Batman: The Brave and the Bold episode entitled "Batman Dies At Dawn!" along with Dick Grayson, Jason Todd, Tim Drake, Stephanie Brown, and Damian Wayne. Kelley joined the New 52 DC universe in Batman and Robin #19, in a story titled Batman and Red Robin.

Talon
The Crime Syndicate version of Robin is called Talon on Earth-3, associate of Owlman. Talon refers to Owlman as his father; whether he is the biological son of Thomas Wayne II or an alternate version of Jason Todd or Tim Drake is unknown. Talon first appeared in Teen Titans #32 (March 2006).

52 Multiverse
In the final issue of 52, a new Multiverse is revealed, originally consisting of 52 identical realities. Among the parallel realities shown is one designated "Earth-2". As a result of Mister Mind "eating" aspects of this reality, it takes on visual aspects similar to the Pre-Crisis Earth-2, including Robin, among other Justice Society of America characters. Based on comments by Grant Morrison, this alternate universe is not the pre-Crisis Earth-2. However, in Justice Society of America Annual #1, published in 2008, the Silver Scarab explains that the events of the Crisis are remembered by the people of this Earth-2, and from their perspective, Earth-2 seemed to be the only Earth to have survived the Crisis, raising theories as to whether or not Earth-2 was really destroyed, or was perhaps replaced by a new Earth-2.  Indeed, in Justice Society of America #20, published in December 2008, Starman explains that during the re-expansion of the DC Multiverse, Earth-2 was reborn "along with everyone on it", including Robin.

Following Flashpoint (2011) and The New 52 reboot, this Earth is replaced by another reimagining of Earth 2, one where Batman's daughter Helena Wayne served as Robin until an incident five years prior to the relaunch sent her to DC's primary continuity, Earth-0, where she works as the Huntress. The 2014 series Earth 2: World's End establishes that Dick Grayson never served as Robin on this Earth, and was instead a reporter who married Barbara Gordon and had a son. During Darkseid's invasion of Earth 2, Barbara is killed, and Dick is trained in how to fight by Ted Grant and goes on a mission to find his missing son.

Robin monthlies
The first Robin miniseries was printed in 1992 following Tim Drake's debut as Robin. The series centered around Tim's continued training and set up villains linked to the character. It was followed up by another series Robin II: The Joker's Wild!, which pitted Tim against his predecessor's murderer the Joker. With Batman out of town, it was up to Tim and Alfred to end the Joker's latest crime spree. A final miniseries, Robin III: Cry of the Huntress wrapped up the trilogy, teaming Tim with the Huntress. In 1993, the success of the three miniseries led to the ongoing Robin series, which ran 183 issues until 2009. The title was replaced by a Batman and Robin series following the Battle for the Cowl miniseries, as well as an ongoing Red Robin monthly which continues the story of Tim Drake.

The ongoing Robin series has taken part in a number of crossovers with other comics, especially Batman and related series. These include:
 Robin (vol. 2) #7: Knightquest: The Search
 Robin (vol. 2) #8: KnightsEnd
 Robin (vol. 2) #9: KnightsEnd: Aftermath
 Robin (vol. 2) #11–13: Prodigal
 Robin (vol. 2) #14: Troika
 Robin (vol. 2) #27–28: Batman: Contagion
 Robin (vol. 2) #32–33: Batman: Legacy
 Robin (vol. 2) #52–53: Batman: Cataclysm
 Robin (vol. 2) #67–73: Batman: No Man's Land
 Robin (vol. 2) #86: Batman: Officer Down
 Robin (vol. 2) #95: Joker: Last Laugh
 Robin (vol. 2) #98–99: Bruce Wayne: Murderer?
 Robin (vol. 2) #129–131: Batman: War Games
 Robin (vol. 2) #168–169: The Resurrection of Ra's al Ghul
 Robin (vol. 2) #175–176: Batman R.I.P.

In addition, two Robin-related series launched in June 2015: We Are Robin, featuring writer Lee Bermejo and artists Rob Haynes and Khary Randolph, and detailing multiple teenagers in Gotham who take up the mantle of Robin; and Robin, Son of Batman, written and drawn by Patrick Gleason, showing the individual adventures of Damian Wayne.

Reception
According to Entertainment Weekly in 2008, Robin is one of the "greatest sidekicks".

Portrayals

Robin (Dick Grayson) was portrayed by Douglas Croft and Johnny Duncan, respectively, in the 1943 and 1949 fifteen chapter Batman serials. Burt Ward played him in the 1966–1968 Batman television series and the related 1966 film. In the live-action movies Batman Forever and Batman & Robin, he was played by Chris O'Donnell. Michael Cera voiced the character in The Lego Batman Movie.

The Dick Grayson version of Robin also appears in Batman: The Animated Series, voiced by Loren Lester. Grayson is replaced by Tim Drake, played by Mathew Valencia, in the subsequent series The New Batman Adventures.

An older version of Robin (Dick Grayson) is portrayed by Brenton Thwaites in the live action series Titans.

The animated series Teen Titans features Robin (voiced by Scott Menville) as the leader of a team of young heroes; it is hinted in several episodes that this Robin is Dick Grayson. In the season two episode  "Fractured", a version of Bat-Mite is introduced who claims to be Robin's "DNA buddy" (genetic twin).  Bat-Mite gives his name as Nosyarg Kcid ("Dick Grayson" spelled backwards). In another episode, Raven reads Robin's mind and sees a man and a woman falling from a trapeze (an event known only to have happened to Grayson and not to any other Robin). In another episode, Starfire travels to the future and discovers that Robin has taken the identity of Nightwing. Menville reprises his role as Robin in Teen Titans Go!. The second-season episode "The Best Robin" introduces Carrie Kelly and Tim Drake as their Robins. They are also voiced by Menville.

Robin is also seen in the 1987 Zeller's commercial, which features the infamous catchphrase, "Well said, Robin!".

Dick Grayson is Robin in Young Justice, voiced by Jesse McCartney. In the second season, Grayson has become Nightwing, while Tim Drake, voiced by Cameron Bowen, is the new Robin, succeeding Jason Todd, who is already dead by the start of the season.

Robin is portrayed by Nick Lang in Holy Musical B@man!. His portrayal is based mainly on Burt Ward's Dick Grayson.

The Damian Wayne version of Robin will appear in the live action film The Brave and the Bold, set in the DC Universe (DCU) media franchise.

Collected editions

See also
 Homosexuality in the Batman franchise
 List of exclamations by Robin

References

External links
 Robin at DC Comics' official website
 Robin on IMDb
 Extensive biography on Dick Grayson
 Extensive biography on Jason Todd
Extensive biography on Tim Drake

Articles about multiple fictional characters
Batman characters code names
Characters created by Bill Finger
Characters created by Bob Kane
Characters created by Jerry Robinson
DC Comics sidekicks
DC Comics American superheroes
DC Comics child superheroes
DC Comics male superheroes
DC Comics female superheroes
DC Comics superheroes
DC Comics martial artists
DC Comics orphans
 
Superheroes who are adopted
Teenage characters in comics
Teenage superheroes
Vigilante characters in comics